The Brantford Expositor is an English language newspaper based in Brantford, Ontario and owned by Postmedia. It provides the readers with coverage of local news, sports and events to the community as well as coverage of provincial, national and international news.

History
The Expositor has been the primary source of news and advertising information for the city of Brantford and County of Brant for over 150 years. The newspaper has published continuously without interruption.

Present day
The Expositor has one of the highest levels of readership for a daily newspaper in the province of Ontario, reaching over 70% of all adults 18 and over, in the coverage area.

The Brantford Expositor is published 6 days a week Monday to Saturday, and has a daily paid circulation of 20,000. The paper serves Brantford, as well as Paris, Burford, and the rest of Brant County.

The Brantford Expositor also publishes Your Brant Connection, a free weekly community paper (delivered every Thursday), which has a distribution of 52,500 to all homes in the Brantford and Brant County area.

In 2010, the newspaper moved from 53 Dalhousie Street in downtown Brantford, to a business park at 195 Henry Street but at the current date, April 4 2022 has no local office. The Newspaper is printed in Hamilton at the Hamilton Spectator

See also
List of newspapers in Canada

References

External links
 
  ISSN 1181-5663

Postmedia Network publications
Mass media in Brantford
Daily newspapers published in Ontario
Publications established in 1852
1852 establishments in Canada